Tomasz Różycki (born 1970) is a Polish poet and translator. He studied Romance Languages at the Jagiellonian University in Kraków, and taught French at the Foreign Languages Teaching College in Opole. In addition to his teaching, he translated and published Stéphane Mallarmé's "Un coup de dés jamais n'abolira le hasard" in 2005, and continues to translate from French for publication.

He has published six books of poetry: Vaterland (1997), Anima (1999), Chata uimaita (Country Cottage, 2001), Świat i Antyświat (World and Antiworld, 2003), the book-length poem Dwanaście stacji (Twelve Stations, 2004), Kolonie (Colonies, 2006) and The Forgotten Keys (2007). His work has appeared in literary journals such as Czas Kultury, Odra, Studium and PEN America, and in German, Bulgarian, Lithuanian, Ukrainian and German poetry anthologies.

Awards and recognition
Tomasz Różycki gained critical acclaim for "Twelve Stations." In 2004, the book-length poem won the prestigious Kościelski Foundation Prize and was named best Book of the Spring 2004 by the Raczyński Library in Poznań. He has received the Krzysztof Kamiel Baczyński Prize (1997), the Czas Kultury Prize (1997), The Rainer Maria Rilke Award (1998), and the Joseph Brodskie Prize from Zeszyty Literackie (2006). He has been nominated twice for the NIKE Prize (2005 and 2007), and once for the Paszport Polityki (2004). Poland's top literary award.

"Colonies," Mira Rosenthal's 2013 translation into English of Kolonie (published by Zephyr Press), was shortlisted for the 2014 Griffin Poetry Prize and the 2014 Oxford-Weidenfeld Translation Prize (UK), and won the 2014 Northern California Book Award for Poetry in Translation. It was long-listed for the 2014 PEN Poetry in Translation Award.

Bibliography
Each year links to its corresponding "[year] in poetry" article:

Original poetry

 1997: Vaterland, Łódź: Stowarzyszenie Literackie im. K.K. Baczyńskiego
 1999: Anima, Zielona Sowa, Kraków
 2001: Chata uimaita ("Country Cottage"), Warsaw: Lampa i Iskra Boża
 2003: Świat i Antyświat ("World and Antiworld"), Warsaw: Lampa i Iskra Boża
 2004: Dwanaście stacji ("Twelve Stations"), a book-length poem, awarded the 2004 Kościelski Prize; Kraków: Znak
 2004: Wiersze, containing all the poems from  Różycki's first four poetry books, Warsaw: Lampa i Iskra Boża
 2006: Kolonie ("Colonies"), 77 poems, 86 pp, Kraków: Znak, 
 2007: The Forgotten Keys

Translation
 2005: translator, Rzut kośćmi nigdy nie zniesie przypadku, translated from the original French of Stéphane Mallarmé, Kraków: Korporacja Ha!Art

References

1970 births
Living people
Jagiellonian University alumni
Polish poets
Polish translators
Polish male poets